Carlos Hernández (born ) is a Cuban male weightlifter, competing in the 56 kg category and representing Cuba at international competitions. He competed at world championships, most recently at the 2011 World Weightlifting Championships.

Major results

References

1983 births
Living people
Cuban male weightlifters
Place of birth missing (living people)
21st-century Cuban people